Bamberg County is a county located in the southwestern portion of U.S. state of South Carolina. As of the 2020 census, the population was 13,311, making the rural county the fourth-least populous of any in South Carolina. Its county seat is Bamberg.

Voorhees College, a historically black college, was established here in the late nineteenth century. It was long affiliated with the Episcopal Church (U.S.).

History
Part of an agricultural area since the antebellum years, this upland area was developed for the cultivation of short-staple cotton. As a result, African Americans have comprised a large portion of the workers and population for much of the county's history.

The rural county was created from the eastern portion of Barnwell County, under the new South Carolina Constitution adopted in 1895; it included an article prescribing the process to establish new counties. The referendum on creating Bamberg County was held on January 19, 1897. The name Bamberg was selected to honor General Francis Marion Bamberg.  In 1919 and again in 1920, tiny portions of northwestern Colleton County were annexed to Bamberg County.

Geography

It is the fourth-smallest county in South Carolina by land area and third-smallest by total area.

State and local protected areas 
 Cathedral Bay Heritage Preserve
 Rivers Bridge State Park

Major water bodies 
 Edisto River
 Lemon Creek
 Little Salkehatchie River
 Salkehatchie River

Adjacent counties 
 Orangeburg County – north
 Dorchester County – east
 Colleton County – southeast
 Hampton County – south
 Allendale County – southwest
 Barnwell County – west

Major highways

Major infrastructure 
 Bamberg County Airport
 Denmark Station

Demographics

2020 census

As of the 2020 United States census, there were 13,311 people, 5,334 households, and 3,355 families residing in the county.

2010 census
As of the 2010 United States Census, there were 15,987 people, 6,048 households, and 3,920 families living in the county. The racial makeup of the county was 61.5% black or African American, 36.1% white, 0.4% Asian, 0.3% American Indian, 0.7% from other races, and 1.0% from two or more races. Those of Hispanic or Latino origin made up 1.6% of the population. In terms of ancestry, 5.1% were American, and 5.0% were German.

Of the 6,048 households, 31.4% had children under the age of 18 living with them, 38.3% were married couples living together, 21.6% had a female householder with no husband present, 35.2% were non-families, and 31.8% of all households were made up of individuals. The average household size was 2.44 and the average family size was 3.07. The median age was 39.3 years.

The median income for a household in the county was $32,538 and the median income for a family was $41,625. Males had a median income of $33,893 versus $27,324 for females. The per capita income for the county was $16,236. About 23.6% of families and 29.9% of the population were below the poverty line, including 40.7% of those under age 18 and 27.0% of those age 65 or over.

2000 census
As of the census of 2000, there were 16,658 people, 6,123 households, and 4,255 families living in the county.  The population density was 42 people per square mile (16 per km2).  There were 7,130 housing units at an average density of 18 per square mile (7per km2).  The racial makeup of the county was 62.50% Black or African American, 36.47% White, 0.16% Native American, 0.19% Asian, 0.01% Pacific Islander, 0.14% from other races, and 0.53% from two or more races.  0.71% of the population were Hispanic or Latino of any race.

There were 6,123 households, out of which 31.10% had children under the age of 18 living with them, 43.60% were married couples living together, 21.30% had a female householder with no husband present, and 30.50% were non-families. 27.80% of all households were made up of individuals, and 11.60% had someone living alone who was 65 years of age or older.  The average household size was 2.55 and the average family size was 3.10.

In the county, the population was spread out, with 25.40% under the age of 18, 12.90% from 18 to 24, 24.60% from 25 to 44, 23.20% from 45 to 64, and 13.90% who were 65 years of age or older.  The median age was 35 years. For every 100 females there were 88.70 males.  For every 100 females age 18 and over, there were 84.00 males.

The median income for a household in the county was $24,007, and the median income for a family was $29,360. Males had a median income of $25,524 versus $3 for females. The per capita income for the county was $12,584.  About 23.90% of families and 27.80% of the population were below the poverty line, including 87.00% of those under age 18 and 80% of those age 65 or over.

Law and Government
The Bamberg county council is the governing body in the county. The council consists of seven members, elected from single-member districts:Sharon Hammond-District 2, Larry Haynes-District 3, Joe Guess, Jr- District 4, Isaiah Odom-District 5, Evert Comer, Jr- District 6, Clint Carter-District 7.

Politics 
Prior to 1948, Bamberg County and South Carolina were Democratic Party strongholds similar to the rest of the Solid South, dominated by white Democrats. Most of the majority population of African Americans, who had supported the Republican Party during Reconstruction and the nineteenth century, had been disenfranchised by Democrats under the 1895 state constitution and related laws. These raised barriers to black voter registration and voting in South Carolina, as did similar laws across the South. After excluding blacks from the political system, the white-dominated legislature passed Jim Crow laws imposing legal segregation. Most blacks did not recover the ability to vote until years after passage of federal civil rights legislation in the mid-1960s.

As a result of the exclusion of black Republicans, white Democratic voters controlled elections in this state and others of the former Confederacy for decades, creating the Solid South. They elected Democratic presidential candidates by nearly unanimous margins of victory, while preserving all the power associated with apportionment based on total population.

The twenty years from 1948 to 1968 were transitional years for the politics of South Carolina and Bamberg County. President Harry Truman ordered integration of the military and took other initiatives on civil rights issues. Discontented with that direction, Southern Dixiecrat candidates twice carried the county, and Republican candidates carried the county three times in this timespan, twice before many African Americans began to vote.

Following Congressional passage of the Voting Rights Act of 1965, as a consequence of the civil rights movement, most African Americans in Bamberg County supported the Democratic Party, but they did not get to full voting strength in the county until after the 1972 presidential election, in which conservative whites carried the county for incumbent Republican President Richard Nixon. He had gained considerable support among whites in the South, a sign of what has become a nearly total shifting of their alliance to the Republican Party. In elections since 1972, the majority of county voters, with the enfranchisement of African Americans, have backed a Republican presidential candidate only once, voting for the popular incumbent Ronald Reagan by 16 votes.

Communities

Cities
 Bamberg (county seat and largest city)
 Denmark

Towns
 Ehrhardt
 Govan
 Olar

See also
 List of counties in South Carolina
 National Register of Historic Places listings in Bamberg County, South Carolina
 South Carolina State Parks
 USS Bamberg County (LST-209)

References

Other sources

External links

 
 

 
1897 establishments in South Carolina
Populated places established in 1897
Black Belt (U.S. region)
Majority-minority counties in South Carolina